"Fool (If You Think It's Over)" is the title of a popular song originally released in 1978 by the British singer-songwriter Chris Rea. Rea also wrote the lyrics and composed the music of the song, which appears on his 1978 debut album, Whatever Happened to Benny Santini? The single's charting success in the USA earned him a Grammy nomination as Best New Artist in 1979.

Background
"Fool (If You Think It's Over)" was the lead single from Rea's debut album Whatever Happened to Benny Santini? which was recorded at producer Gus Dudgeon's Thames Valley recording studio The Mill. The song's inspiration was the experience Rea's younger sister Paula had had some years previously of being devastated at losing her first boyfriend, "Fool..."'s lyrics being the advice (real or imagined) with which Rea had responded to his sister's experience. Rea would recall that he had written "Fool..." as a song which Al Green might record: (quote:) "I’d always seen it as a Memphis [soul] song [but] I never had the chance to voice my opinion about what I thought about the production" of his own recording of the song  of which Rea has elsewhere stated: "[It was in the] wrong key. It ended up being this huge California thing [see California Sound]. It’s the only track I never played guitar on which tells you something about the spirit of it. On top of that, it was just a huge hit. So there was nothing I could do. It was like: 'This is not me! Rea did play keyboards on "Fool..." with the track's background vocals provided by Rea and the Mill's assistant engineer Stuart Epps.

The song, written in the key of G major, uses the ii–V–I turnaround, common in jazz and R&B.

Unsuccessful in its initial UK single release in March 1978, "Fool..." was afforded a June 1978 release in the US where it entered the Top 40 of the Hot 100 singles chart in Billboard magazine in July 1978 to reach a #12 peak on the Hot 100 dated 16 September 1978, then being in the second week of a three-week tenure at #1 on the Billboard Easy Listening chart. On the strength of its US success Rea was invited to perform "Fool..." on the 28 September 1978 TOTP broadcast which evidently facilitated a belated UK chart run for the single with a 28 October 1978 peak of #30.

The considerable success of "Fool...", particularly in the US, was evidently lost on Rea. He recalls being dejected during the 1978 Yuletide overnight drive home from London while considering abandoning what he saw as his failing singing career to fall back on his family's established business of running a restaurant. However, when Rea and his wife Joan reached their Middlesbrough home in the early morning "we opened the door of the house we were just about to lose the mortgage on, and the snow fell into the hall and it didn’t melt – it was that cold – and there was one letter on the floor" – the letter in fact accompanied by a substantial royalty cheque generated by "Fool...", enabling Rea to buy a Ferrari 308 GT4. The journey inspired his later hit "Driving Home for Christmas".

Rea would remake "Fool (If You Think It's Over)" for his 1988 self-produced album New Light Through Old Windows, and this version of "Fool..." would have a Dutch single release charting at #90. In 2007 Rea would again remake "Fool..." in a session at The Mill – now known as Sol Studios – where the original had been recorded: Rea produced and played all instruments on the track which was included on his 2008 European CD release Fool If You Think It's Over (The Definitive Greatest Hits).

The music journalist Wayne Jacik mentioned the single in his work Billboard Book of One-Hit Wonders.

Chart performance (Chris Rea)

Covers

Elkie Brooks version
In 1982 Elkie Brooks had a Top 20 hit in the UK and South Africa with her remake of "Fool If You Think It's Over" - so titled - which like the Chris Rea original was produced by Gus Dudgeon and recorded at the Mill. Brooks' version was one of eight tracks recorded with Dudgeon in 1980 for her 1981 twelve-track album release Pearls which also included four of Brooks' previous hit singles: Brooks (quote) - "Most of [Pearl'''s new] material had been chosen by [A&M exec] Derek Green or Gus Dudgeon. I had insisted that we did [sic] 'Fool...'. Chris Rea has always been one of my favourite musicians and writers and I thought the song was pure class."

Brooks' version of "Fool..." was issued as a single in December 1981 when Pearls issued the previous month was in the Top Ten of the UK album chart - three advance singles had been issued off the album since July 1980 without charting - with "Fool..." rising to a #17 peak on the UK chart dated 27 February 1982 assisted by two TOTP performances by Brooks one of which was re-run. (After taping her 11 February 1982 TOTP performance of "Fool...", Brooks was approached backstage by a fan asking for her autograph who Brooks soon intuited was in fact Chris Rea incognito.)  In Ireland, "Fool..." became Brooks' highest-charting single with a #6 chart peak.

In a 2014 pre-concert interview Brooks, when asked what "big numbers" she looked forward to singing, replied: "I still really like 'Don't Cry Out Loud', 'Sunshine After the Rain' and of course 'Fool If You Think It’s Over': that is a terrific song."

"Fool If You Think It's Over" by Elkie Brooks was the first track played on Radio Caroline when the station resumed broadcasting at 10 a.m. 20 August 1983 after a down period of 41 months.

Chart history

Other versions
Thomas Anders remade "Fool (If You Think It's Over)" for his 1989 album release Different, said version being the third produced by Gus Dudgeon. The song has also been recorded by Dave (as "Le palmier du pauvre" French,  1978), Kirka (as "Luulitko kaiken menneen" Finnish, 1979), Greger (fi) (as "Luulitko kaiken menneen" Finnish (album Greger, 1980) and Paul Nicholas (album Just Good Friends, 1986). The song served as the theme to the 1990s British sitcom Joking Apart''. Kenny Craddock arranged and performed this version.

See also
List of number-one adult contemporary singles of 1978 (U.S.)

References

External links
 [ Song review] by Mike DeGagne at Allmusic
 List of cover versions of "Fool (If You Think It's Over)"
 

1978 songs
1978 singles
1981 singles
1988 singles
A&M Records singles
Chris Rea songs
Elkie Brooks songs
Magnet Records singles
Song recordings produced by Gus Dudgeon
Songs written by Chris Rea
United Artists Records singles